The mod revival was a subculture that started in the United Kingdom in the late 1970s and later spread to other countries (to a lesser degree). The mod revival's mainstream popularity was relatively short, although its influence lasted for decades. The mod revival post-dated a Teddy Boy revival, and mod revivalists sometimes clashed with Teddy Boy revivalists, skinhead revivalists, casuals, punks and rival gang members.

The late 1970s mod revival was led by the band the Jam, who had adopted a stark mod look and mixed the energy of punk with the sound of early 1960s mod bands. It was heavily influenced by the 1979 film Quadrophenia. The mod revival was a conscious effort to harken back to the earlier generation in terms of style and presentation. In the early 1980s in the UK, a mod revival scene influenced by the original mod subculture of the 1960s developed.

1970s

The late 1970s mod revival combined musical and cultural elements of the 1970s pub rock, punk rock and new wave music genres with influences from 1960s mod and beat music bands such as the Who, Small Faces, the Kinks and The Beatles.

The mod revival was largely set in motion by the Jam and their fans. The band had adopted a stark mod look and mixed the energy of punk with the sound of 1960s mod bands. Their debut album In the City (1977), mixed R&B standards with originals modelled on the Who's early singles. They confirmed their status as the leading mod revival band with their third album All Mod Cons (1978), on which Paul Weller's song-writing drew heavily on the British-focused narratives of the Kinks. The revival was also spurred on by small concerts at venues such as the Cambridge Hotel, Edmonton, Hop Poles Hotel and Howard Hall both in Enfield, the Wellington, Waterloo Road, London, and the Bridge House in Canning Town. In 1979, the film Quadrophenia, which romanticised the original 1960s mod subculture, widened the impact and popularity of the mod revival across the UK. The original mod revival fanzine, Maximum Speed started in 1979 and spawned other home-produced fanzines from then until the mid-to-late 1980s.

Bands grew up to feed the desire for mod music, often combining the music of 1960s mod groups with elements of punk music, including the Chords, Secret Affair, Purple Hearts and the Lambrettas. These acts managed to develop cult followings and some had pop hits, before the revival petered out in the early 1980s. More R'n'B based bands such as the Little Roosters, the Inmates, Nine Below Zero also became key acts in the growing mod revival scene in London.

Another British tradition that returned at the same time was the penchant for members of youth subcultures to go to seaside resorts on bank holidays and fight members of other subcultures. This originated in the early 1960s with the mods and rockers fighting each other at places such as Brighton. The phenomenon returned in 1969 through to 1970 with skinheads fighting Teddy boys and bikers. In 1977 it returned yet again, with punks fighting Teddy Boys at Margate, and revival skinheads fighting Teddy boys, bikers and rockers at Southend and Margate. This carried on until 1978. In 1979 and 1980, the resorts became major battlegrounds on bank holidays for young skinheads and mods together against Teddy boys and rockers. Some of the main resorts involved were Margate, Brighton, Southend, Clacton, Hastings and Scarborough.

In 1979 the mod scene in Australia began and took off particularly in Sydney & Melbourne, led by bands such as The Sets, Little Murders, Division 4, The Introverts & The Go. There was a documentary made in early 1981 called The Go-Set about the mod revival scene in Sydney & Melbourne. There was also a book published about the mod scene in Australia from 1979-1986.

1980s

Paul Weller broke up the Jam in 1982 and formed the Style Council, who abandoned most of the punk rock elements to adopt music much more based in R&B and early soul.

In the mid-1980s, there was a brief mod revival centered on bands such as the Prisoners. Fanzines following on from Maximum Speed – such as Mission Impossible, Patriotic, Roadrunner, Extraordinary Sensations and Chris Hunt and Karl Bedingfield's Shadows & Reflections –  helped generate further interest in this stage of the mod revival. The Phoenix List was a weekly newsletter listing national events, and they organised a series of national rallies. A main player in the 1980s UK mod revival was Eddie Piller, who founded Countdown Records, and then went on to develop the acid jazz movement of the late 1980s. in 1985 the Mod alldayer in Walthamstow paired tribute to band aid sponsored by unicorn records and had a host of 80’s mod revival bands playing, old and new. Making Time, probably being one of the biggest mod revival bands of the 80’s after the jam. And a well known north London mod band called the OUTLETS; band members being Steve Byrne and Mario Vitrano who also supported Steve Marriott packet of 3 and geno Washington at various gigs in north London in the mid 80’s.

The UK mod revival was followed by a mod revival North America in the early 1980s, particularly in Southern California, led by bands such as the Untouchables and Manual Scan. While on the East Coast (yet touring heavily in California) Mod Fun carried the revival torch.  In Brazil the band Ira! led the mod revival releasing their first album Mudança de comportamento in 1985 on the WEA label. Their 1986 followup "Vivendo e Não Aprendendo" further established them as leaders of the mod revival in Brazil. They quickly achieved Gold Album status in sales of "Vivendo e Não Aprendendo".

1990s and later
Bands associated with Britpop in the mid-1990s often championed aspects of mod culture. Blur were fans of Quadrophenia, with the film's star Phil Daniels featuring on the title track of the band's album Parklife and appearing in the song's video, whilst Oasis' Noel Gallagher struck up a high-profile friendship with Paul Weller. Around this time the UK music press championed a number of bands as constituting a new wave of the mod revival under the name "New Mod", including Menswe@r and the Bluetones, both of whom were later identified with Britpop.

In 2010, the mod-influenced band Missing Andy saw their debut single, "The Way We're Made (Made in England)", reach number 38 on the UK Singles Chart and number 7 on the UK Indie Chart after their status was confirmed as runners-up in Sky1's TV talent competition, Must Be the Music.

A number of 1970s mod revival bands have reunited in recent years to play concerts, including Secret Affair, the Chords and the Purple Hearts.

Footnotes

External links
The Mod Revival Article by Chris Hunt, published in the New Musical Express, April 2005
The ModPopPunk Archives Information about mod revival bands
Mod-ernworld Information and photos
1980s Mod Revival Photos from the 1980s Mod scenes from around the world

 
Youth culture in the United Kingdom
English styles of music
Punk rock genres
British rock music genres
Mod (subculture)